Burtonville is an unincorporated community in Clinton County, in the U.S. state of Ohio.

History
Burtonville was named in the 1840s after Peyton Burton, the proprietor of a local gristmill. Burtonville was never officially platted.

References

Unincorporated communities in Clinton County, Ohio
Unincorporated communities in Ohio